The Yogāvacara's manual  is a Theravada Buddhist meditation manual with unique and unorthodox features such as the use of mental images of the elements, the mantra "A-RA-HAN", and the use of a candle for meditation. It has been loosely dated from the 16th to the 17th century.

Overview
The text is addressed to a "Yogāvacara", referring to any practitioner of Buddhist meditation and hence it is a practical meditation manual.   

The text covers Buddhist meditation material such as the ten recollections (anussati), the brahmaviharas, the five kinds of piti (joy), the four formless realms (arūpajhāna), the nimittas, and 10 vipassanā-ñāṇas. It teaches a form of breath meditation in which one cultivates a bright perception of a nimitta at the tip of the nose and moves it down the body to the heart and then to the navel. It also includes many other exercises such as meditation using a candle flame,  and the use of mental images of the elements (mahābhūta).

The single rare Pali and Sinhalese manuscript was discovered in 1893 at Bamabara-walla Vihara in Sri Lanka by Anagarika Dharmapala. T.W. Rhys Davids of the Pali Text Society translated the text into English in 1896. It was later translated by F.L. Woodward as "Manual of a Mystic". The manuscript has no information on the author and has no title.

Some scholars like Francois Bizot have argued that this work is influenced by the esoteric Theravada tradition, though other such as Justin Thomas McDaniel find this assertion dubious. Caroline Rhys Davids notes that in the 16th and 17th centuries monks from Siam were invited by the Kandyan kings to revive Buddhism in the island and states it is possible that the manual derives from this tradition.

See also
 Vimuttimagga
 Visuddhimagga
 Samatha
 Vipassana
 Boran Meditation

Notes

References
 Rhys Davids, T.W. (1896), The Yogavacara's Manual of Indian Mysticism, London, Oxford University Press.
Woodward, EL. (1916), Manual of a Mystic being a translation from the Pali and Sinhalese Work entitled The Yogavachara's Manual, Pali Text Society, London, reprint 1982, .

Pali Buddhist texts
Theravada Buddhist texts
Buddhist meditation